The socialist mode of production, sometimes referred to as the communist mode of production, or simply (Marxian) socialism or communism as Karl Marx and Friedrich Engels used the terms communism and socialism interchangeably, is a specific historical phase of economic development and its corresponding set of social relations that emerge from capitalism in the schema of historical materialism within Marxist theory. The Marxist definition of socialism is that of production for use-value (i.e. direct satisfaction of human needs, or economic demands), therefore the law of value no longer directs economic activity. Marxist production for use is coordinated through conscious economic planning. According to Marx, distribution of products is based on the principle of "to each according to his needs"; Soviet models often distributed products based on the principle of "to each according to his contribution". The social relations of socialism are characterized by the proletariat effectively controlling the means of production, either through cooperative enterprises or by public ownership or private artisanal tools and self-management. Surplus value goes to the working class and hence society as a whole.

The Marxian conception of socialism stands in contrast to other early conceptions of socialism, most notably early forms of market socialism based on classical economics such as mutualism and Ricardian socialism. Unlike the Marxian conception, these conceptions of socialism retained commodity exchange (markets) for labour and the means of production seeking to perfect the market process. The Marxist idea of socialism was also heavily opposed to utopian socialism. Although Marx and Engels wrote very little on socialism and neglected to provide any details on how it might be organized, numerous social scientists and neoclassical economists have used Marx's theory as a basis for developing their own models of socialist economic systems. The Marxist view of socialism served as a point of reference during the socialist calculation debate.

Marx himself did not use the term socialism to refer to this development. Instead, Marx called it a communist society that has not yet reached its higher-stage. The term socialism was popularized during the Russian Revolution by Vladimir Lenin. This view is consistent with and helped to inform early concepts of socialism in which the law of value no longer directs economic activity. Monetary relations in the form of exchange-value, profit, interest and wage labour would not operate and apply to Marxist socialism.

Mode of production 

Karl Marx described a socialist society as such:

Socialism is a post-commodity economic system and production is carried out to directly produce use-value rather than toward generating profit. The accumulation of capital is rendered insufficient in socialism as production is carried out independently of capital accumulation in a planned fashion. There have been other concepts of economic planning, including decentralised and participatory planning. One of Marx's main manuscripts is a posthumous work called Grundrisse, published in 1953. In this work, Marx's thinking is explored regarding production, consumption, distribution, social impact of capitalism. Communism is considered as a living model for humans after capitalism. The emphasis is upon fair distribution of goods, equality and the optimum environment for humans to live in to develop themselves to their best capabilities (art, politics and philosophy, among others) to achieve happiness and to satisfy intrinsic needs. Marx's goal was to design a social system that eliminates the differences in classes between the proletariat and the bourgeoisie. In doing so, the tension and the power differences which force workers to labor in bad conditions for poor wages, disappear. According to Marx, capitalism is a system guaranteed to collapse because big companies would buy small companies, leading to monopoly. In such a scenario, a very small number of people control most of the money and power. Poverty for the masses would prevail. Significant capital to buy products from the capitalist production system would be unavailable. Marx postulated that if workers are paid enough so that they still are able to buy products in a capitalist market, they will become essential contributors in assuring the domination of capitalism worldwide.

Market forces to compel capitalists to produce use-values in pursuit of exchange-value. Socialist production involves rational planning of use-values and coordination of investment decisions to attain economic goals. In this approach, cyclical fluctuations that occur in a capitalist market economy do not exist in a socialist economy. The value of a good in socialism is its physical utility rather than its embodied labour, cost of production and exchange value as in a capitalist system. Socialism makes use of incentive-based systems, so inequality would still exist, but diminishingly so since workers are worker-owners. In this way, inequality is also diminished and capital and power is more widely distributed. The method of compensation and reward in a socialist society would be based on an authentic meritocracy along the principle of "From each according to his ability, to each according to his contribution".

The advanced stage of socialism, referred to as the upper-stage communism in the Critique of the Gotha Programme, is based on the socialist mode of production. It is different from lower-stage socialism in fundamental ways. While socialism implies public ownership (by a proletarian semi-state apparatus) or cooperative ownership (by a worker cooperative enterprise), communism would be based on common ownership of the means of production. Class distinctions based on ownership of capital cease to exist, along with the need for a state. A superabundance of goods and services are made possible by automated production that allow for goods to be distributed based on need rather than merit.

Social relations 
The fundamental goal of socialism from the view of Karl Marx and Friedrich Engels was the realization of human freedom and individual autonomy. Specifically, this refers to freedom from the alienation imposed upon individuals in the form of coercive social relations as well as material scarcity, whereby the individual is compelled to engage in activities merely to survive to reproduce his or herself. The aim of socialism is to provide an environment whereby individuals are free to express their genuine interests, creative freedom and desires unhindered by forms of social control that force individuals to work for a class of owners who expropriate and live off the surplus product.

As a set of social relations, socialism is defined by the degree to which economic activity in society is planned by the associated producers so that the surplus product produced by socialised assets is controlled by a majority of the population through democratic processes. The sale of labour power would be abolished so that every individual participates in running their institution as stakeholders or members with no one having coercive power over anyone else in a vertical social division of labour which is to be distinguished from a non-social, technical division of labour which would still exist in socialism. The incentive structure changes in a socialist society given the change in the social environment so that an individual labourers' work becomes increasingly autonomous and creative, creating a sense of responsibility for his or her institution as a stakeholder.

Role of the state 
In Marxist theory, the state is "the institution of organised violence which is used by the ruling class of a country to maintain the conditions of its rule. Thus, it is only in a society which is divided between hostile social classes that the state exists". The state is seen as a mechanism dominated by the interests of the ruling class. It subjugates other classes, to protect and legitimize the existing economic system.

After a proletarian revolution, the state would initially become the instrument of the proletariat. Conquest of the state by the proletariat is a prerequisite to establishing a socialist system. As socialism is built, the role and scope of the state changes. Class distinctions, based on ownership of the means of production, gradually deteriorate. The concentration of means of production increasingly falls into state hands. Once all means of production become state property, the primary function of the state changes. Political rule via coercion over men diminishes through the creation and enforcement of laws, scientific administration and the direction of the processes of production. As a result, the state becomes an entity of economic coordination rather than a mechanism of class or political control and is no longer a state in the Marxian sense.

See also 

 Capitalist mode of production
 Communism
 Critique of political economy
 Economic planning
 Green socialism
 Law of value
 Marxism
 Marxian economics
 Mode of production
 Post-capitalism
 Primary stage of socialism
 Production for use
 Relations of production
 Scientific socialism
 Socialist calculation debate
 Socialist economics
 Socialisation
 Yellow socialism

References 

Economic ideologies
Economic systems
Marxian economics
Materialism
Political ideologies
Political movements